Imran Hussain (born on March 10, 1981), is a retired Pakistani footballer who last played for Pakistan Army as a (striker). He is a two time Pakistan Premier League winner, winning first in 2005–06 and second in 2006–07, he also won the golden boot in 2005–06 season scoring 21 goals in 22 games.

He made his international debut against India on 12 June 2005.

References

1981 births
Living people
Pakistani footballers
Pakistan international footballers

Association football forwards
Pakistan Army F.C. players